Charles McClain (born May 22, 1989) is an American football wide receiver who is currently a free agent. He played college football at the University of North Alabama.

Early life
McClain attended Oxford High School, in Oxford, Alabama, where he was an All-County and All-State selection for the football team.

College career
McClain signed to play college football at the University of North Alabama.

Professional career

Alabama Hammers
From 2011 to 2015, McClain was a member of the Alabama Hammers of both the Southern Indoor Football League and the Professional Indoor Football League. In 2012, McClain was named First Team All-PIFL as a kick returner. In 2013, McClain was named Second Team All-PIFL as a kick returner, and in 2014, McClain was named Second Team All-PIFL as an ironman.

New Orleans VooDoo
In April, 2015, McClain signed with the New Orleans VooDoo of the Arena Football League. Joining the VooDoo reunited McClain with his former Hammers' head coach, Dean Cokinos. McClain caught 35 passes as a rookie for the VooDoo. When the VooDoo ceased operations on August 9, 2015, McClain became a free agent.

Cleveland Gladiators
On October 16, 2015, McClain was assigned to the Cleveland Gladiators.

Monterrey Steel
On February 13, 2017, McClain signed with the Monterrey Steel.

Washington Valor
On April 26, 2017, McClain was assigned to the Washington Valor.

References

External links

Minot State bio
Arena Football bio

Living people
1989 births
American football wide receivers
North Alabama Lions football players
Alabama Hammers players
New Orleans VooDoo players
Cleveland Gladiators players
Monterrey Steel players
Washington Valor players
Players of American football from Alabama
People from Oxford, Alabama
Lehigh Valley Steelhawks players